The Lochmaben Stone is a megalith standing in a field, nearly a mile west of the Sark mouth on the Solway Firth, three hundred yards or so above high water mark on the farm of Old Graitney in Dumfries & Galloway in Scotland. The area is also known as Stormont. Together with a smaller stone it is all that is left of a stone circle dating back to around 3000BC.

The principal stone or megalith, referred to as the Lochmabonstone by Logan Mack in 1926, has, in the Borders context, an unsurpassed extent of history attached to it. It is an erratic, 7 feet high and 18 feet in girth and weighs approximately ten tons. It is composed of weathered granite, exposed to severe glacial action.

In these treeless flatlands this stone, given its size, would have been a distinctive landmark on the flat Solway Plain for several millennia.

Etymology

The Lochmaben stone has had a wide range of names attached to it over the last few millennia or so. Lochmabonstone, Stormont, and Old Graitney stone are amongst the most recent. In 1398 the name is 'Clochmabenstane', in 1409 and 1472 the name 'Loumabanestane' is recorded, with 'Lowmabanstane' used in 1485 and then 'Loughmabanestane' in 1494.

'Cloch' and 'clach' mean 'stone' in modern Irish and Scottish Gaelic respectively. In Welsh, 'llech' can be a flagstone, tablet or slate.

The element Mabon, as in the Celtic god, is common to all of the variants and this strongly confirms this association, as well as helping with the identification of this site with the Roman site of 'Locus Maponi', as listed in the Ravenna Cosmography. It is also suggested that Locus Maponi means the 'Loch' or 'Pool' of Mabon and this would suggest that the town of Lochmaben is the intended named site.

Maporitum is another name recorded in the cosmography and given that the name relates to the Ford of Mabon and indeed the name 'Solway' is most likely derived from the word Sul standing for the pillar or Lochmaben stone and the word Wath that is of Viking origin and means to 'wade', indicating a ford. The stone marked the northern terminus of the most useful ford on the Esk and another suggested meaning for the name 'Sulwath' is 'Muddy ford'.

The Old Gaelic cloch or Brittonic *clog element is found with the 1398 record 'Clockmabanstane', and this suggests that as in the modern Gaelic clach, meaning stone, the whole name may mean the 'stone or burial place of Mabon'. The loss of the initial C- is due to the influence of the name Lochmaben, 18 miles north-west. The name Clackmannan is another example where the Gaelic word is undeniably linked with a stone, in this case still on view in the town centre.

Archaeology 
Only two of these stones are visible above the surface of the ground, one being the Lochmaben Stone. The other stone stands 1.0 m high by 1.2 m in diameter in a less conspicuous position in the nearby hedge to the north east of the larger stone. The 1845 'New Statistical Account' also relates that a ring of large stones once stood here, enclosing an area of around half an acre, most of which were removed shortly before that date to facilitate ploughing of the site.

In 1982 the stone fell over, and excavations prior to its re-erection revealed that it had been set into a shallow pit. No artifacts were recovered. However, a sample of mixed Oak and Hazel charcoal taken from the lower fill of the stone-pit yielded a radiocarbon date of approximately 3275 BC according to Aubrey Burl.

The cult of Maponus or Mabon

The name of the stone strongly suggests that this site was a centre of the cult of the Celtic god Mabon or Maponus. The name has its origins in map, the Old Welsh for 'son of' and is suggestive of a divine youth. He is said to have been the divine patron of the Kingdom of Rheged and dedications to his cult have so far been found at Birrens, Brampton, Chesterholm (Vindolanda), Corbridge and Ribchester. Mabon may have been a god of fertility: the Romans made him a British Apollo. Tolstoy sees Merlin as a chief druid carrying out ceremonies at the Clochmabenstane.

Sometime during the seventh century, an unknown monk in the Monastery at Ravenna on the Adriatic (eastern) coast of Italy compiled a list of all the towns and road-stations throughout the Roman Empire; this important historical document has since become known as the Ravenna Cosmography and it lists a 'Locus Maponi' which has been tentatively identified with the Lochmaben stone site.

The border line and the Lochmaben Stone 
The Lochmaben Stone was a well known, well recognised and easily located 'marker' on the Scottish Marches and as such it performed a number of functions prior to the Union of the Crowns, such as arrangements for truces, exchange of prisoners, etc.

Rendezvous
Raiding parties met here before launching expeditions into England and Scottish armies assembled here before major incursions or defence operations took place. It may well have been a tribal assembly point. An army was ordered to assemble here as late as 6 February 1557.

Exchange of prisoners
In 1398 an exchange of prisoners took place when English and Scots representatives, the Dukes of Rothesay and Lancaster met at the Lochmaben Stone. The prisoners were released without ransoms and any that had already been paid were to be returned.

The Commissioners and the Wardens of the Western Marches
Its use by the Marcher Lords or Wardens suggests that the Scots regarded the Lochmaben stone as being the southernmost limit of the Scottish realm. In 1398 an indenture was made at 'Clochmabenstane' for the men of Tyndale and Redesdale to meet from Whitsunday to Michaelmas at Kershope Bridge. The Commissioners not only met here, but "gave bail for their good behaviour to one another."

In 1398 the agreement was reached that "The men of Galloway, Nithsdale, Annandale and Crawford Muir, shall meet with the Wardens of the West March for redress of claims at Clochmabanstane."

In 1473, the Scottish and English Ambassadors met to agree that more frequent meetings of the marcher Wardens were to be held at the six recognised sites on the marches. These were Newbyggynfurde, Redaneburn, Gammyllispethe, Belle, Loumabanestane and Kershopebrig and the meetings were to be held at successive venues. On 26 March 1494 the commissioners of both countries met at the Lochmaben Stone to finally settle the long running dispute over the 'Fish Garth' across the River Esk.

In the 16th century a reference is recorded "Loughmaben Stone standyng in Scotland, wher we have beyn accustomyd to keipe days of marches."

Recent history 
In the 1800s the tenant of Old Graitney farm decided to clear his land of the three remaining stones which ruined his field's appearance and got in the way of his machinery. He set his farm hands to work digging deep pits for the burial of the stones. One had been completely buried and another partially sunken when the proprietor, Lord Mansfield, arrived at the scene and stopped further operations. The stone was still used as a gathering place for the locality into comparatively recent times.

A local tradition suggests that the stone was moved by a farm worker with an excavator, the intention being to locate any 'treasure' beneath. The local primary school attended an official re-erection ceremony which was covered by the local paper, the Dumfries and Galloway Standard 22 September 1995.

The Battle of Sark or Lochmaben Stone

The Auchinleck Chronicle records that on 23 October 1448 a Scottish Army under the command of Hugh Douglas, Earl of Ormonde, and Sir John Wallace of Craigie won a resounding victory over the invading English forces of the younger Henry Percy, 2nd Earl of Northumberland. There is nothing to mark the site of the battle ground. 3,000 Englishmen were slain or drowned in flight. Many prisoners were taken. Estimated Scots losses range from a low of 26 to a high of 600, the most serious of whom was Sir John Wallace of Craigie, Sheriff of Ayr, who was mortally wounded, dying some time after the battle.

Miscellaneous notes

The Old Graitney Boat Burial
At NY 31 66 a Viking boat-shaped barrow or mound existed. It was levelled around the year 1851, but no burials or Viking artefacts are recorded as having been found.

Old Graitney – The 'Auld House'
This tower-house was built by the Johnstones in 1535 and burnt by the Maxwells in 1585. Locally a tower is said to have stood 180 m south of the Old Graitney Farmhouse although no traces are visible on the ground.

Port Stormont
This site at NY 316 660 is recorded as having been used by smugglers. The title of Viscount Stormont is a title in the Peerage of Scotland created in 1621 by James VI for Sir David Murray. It is a subsidiary title of the Earl of Mansfield and Mansfield. The family held land in this area and no doubt some connection exists between the title and the area.

Quern stone
The upper stone of a rotary quern was found about 1976 when ploughing some 350 m SSW of Old Graitney farmhouse, where it is still held by the finder, Mr S Smith. Slightly oval in shape it measures about 30 cm in maximum diameter and is made of granite or a similar rock; there are both central and side-holes.

King Arthur
A local legend associates the Lochmaben Stone with the stone from which King Arthur pulled the sword Excalibur. However, this only agrees with some versions of the Arthurian legend. In other versions of the Arthurian legend, Excalibur was a sword that came from the water from the Lady of the Lake, and the sword in the stone does not have a name.

See also
 Stones of Scotland
 Stone circles in the British Isles and Brittany
 List of stone circles

References

External links 
  A Researcher's Guide to Local History terminology
 Photographs of the Lochmaben Stone.
 Video of Scottish Glacial Erratics in History, Myth & Legend

Archaeological sites in Dumfries and Galloway
Archaeological artifacts
Scottish mythology
Megalithic monuments in Scotland
Stone Age sites in Scotland
Scheduled monuments in Scotland
Stone circles in Dumfries and Galloway
Anglo-Scottish border